Alcazar Theatre may refer to:

Alcazar Theatre (1885), O'Farrell Street in San Francisco; destroyed in the earthquake and fire of 1906
Alcazar Theatre (1911), O'Farrell Street in San Francisco; demolished in 1961
Alcazar Theatre (1976), Geary Street in San Francisco built in 1917
Alcazar Theatre (Birmingham, Alabama), movie theatre later renamed the Capitol Theater
Alcazar Theatre (Vancouver, British Columbia) performance space, later renamed the York 
Alcazar Theatre (Pattaya, Thailand)
Alcazar Theatre (London, England), opened in 1913, bombed in World War Two 
 Playhouse Theatre (Portland, Oregon), formerly known as Alcazar Theatre